Küçükakçaalan is a village in Dursunbey District, Balıkesir Province, Turkey.

References

Villages in Dursunbey District